Disulfiram is a medication used to support the treatment of chronic alcoholism by producing an acute sensitivity to ethanol (drinking alcohol). Disulfiram works by inhibiting the enzyme acetaldehyde dehydrogenase, causing many of the effects of a hangover to be felt immediately following alcohol consumption. Disulfiram plus alcohol, even small amounts, produces flushing, throbbing in the head and neck, a throbbing headache, respiratory difficulty, nausea, copious vomiting, sweating, thirst, chest pain, palpitation, dyspnea, hyperventilation, fast heart rate, low blood pressure, fainting, marked uneasiness, weakness, vertigo, blurred vision, and confusion. In severe reactions there may be respiratory depression, cardiovascular collapse, abnormal heart rhythms, heart attack, acute congestive heart failure, unconsciousness, convulsions, and death.

In the body, alcohol is converted to acetaldehyde, which is then broken down by acetaldehyde dehydrogenase. When the dehydrogenase enzyme is inhibited, acetaldehyde builds up, causing unpleasant side effects. Disulfiram should be used in conjunction with counseling and support.

Medical uses 
Disulfiram is used as a second-line treatment, behind acamprosate and naltrexone, for alcohol dependence.

Under normal metabolism, alcohol is broken down in the liver by the enzyme alcohol dehydrogenase to acetaldehyde, which is then converted by the enzyme acetaldehyde dehydrogenase to a harmless acetic acid derivative (acetyl coenzyme A).  Disulfiram blocks this reaction at the intermediate stage by blocking acetaldehyde dehydrogenase.  After alcohol intake under the influence of disulfiram, the concentration of acetaldehyde in the blood may be five to 10 times higher than that found during metabolism of the same amount of alcohol alone.  As acetaldehyde is one of the major causes of the symptoms of a "hangover", this produces immediate and severe negative reaction to alcohol intake. About 5 to 10 minutes after alcohol intake, the patient may experience the effects of a severe hangover for a period of 30 minutes up to several hours. Symptoms usually include flushing of the skin, accelerated heart rate, low blood pressure, nausea, and vomiting. Uncommon adverse events include shortness of breath, throbbing headache, visual disturbance, mental confusion, postural syncope, and circulatory collapse.

Disulfiram should not be taken if alcohol has been consumed in the last 12 hours. There is no tolerance to disulfiram: the longer it is taken, the stronger its effects. As disulfiram is absorbed slowly through the digestive tract and eliminated slowly by the body, the effects may last for up to two weeks after the initial intake; consequently, medical ethics dictate that patients must be fully informed about the disulfiram-alcohol reaction.

Disulfiram does not reduce alcohol cravings, so a major problem associated with this drug is extremely poor compliance. Methods to improve compliance include subdermal implants, which release the drug continuously over a period of up to 12 weeks, and supervised administration practices, for example, having the drug regularly administered by one's spouse.

Although disulfiram remained the most common pharmaceutical treatment of alcohol abuse until the end of the 20th century, today it is often replaced or accompanied with newer drugs, primarily the combination of naltrexone and acamprosate, which directly attempt to address physiological processes in the brain associated with alcohol abuse.

Side effects 
The most common side effects in the absence of alcohol are headache, and a metallic or garlic taste in the mouth, though more severe side effects may occur. Tryptophol, a chemical compound that induces sleep in humans, is formed in the liver after disulfiram treatment. Less common side effects include decrease in libido, liver problems, skin rash, and nerve inflammation. Liver toxicity is an uncommon but potentially serious side effect, and risk groups e.g. those with already impaired liver function should be monitored closely. That said, the rate of disulfiram-induced hepatitis are estimated to be in between 1 per 25,000 to 1 in 30,000, and rarely the primary cause for treatment cessation.

Cases of disulfiram neurotoxicity have also occurred, causing extrapyramidal and other symptoms.  Disulfiram can produce neuropathy in daily doses of less than the usually recommended 500 mg. Nerve biopsies showed axonal degeneration and the neuropathy is difficult to distinguish from that associated with ethanol abuse. Disulfiram neuropathy occurs after a variable latent period (mean 5 to 6 months) and progresses steadily. Slow improvement may occur when the drug's use is stopped; often there is complete recovery eventually.

Disulfiram disrupts metabolism of several other compounds, including paracetamol (acetaminophen), theophylline and caffeine. However, in most cases, this disruption is mild and presents itself as a 20–40% increase in the half-life of the compound at typical dosages of disulfiram.

Similarly acting substances
In medicine, the term "disulfiram effect" refers to an adverse effect of a particular medication in causing an unpleasant hypersensitivity to alcohol, similar to the effect caused by disulfiram administration.

Examples:
 Antibiotics (nitroimidazoles), e.g. metronidazole
 First-generation sulfonylureas, e.g. tolbutamide and chlorpropamide
 Several cephalosporin drugs, including cefoperazone, cefamandole and cefotetan, that have a N-methylthio-tetrazole moiety
 Griseofulvin, an oral antifungal drug
 Procarbazine
 Temposil, or citrated calcium carbimide, has the same function as disulfiram, but is weaker and safer.
 Coprine, which metabolizes to 1-aminocyclopropanol, a chemical having the same metabolic effects as disulfiram.  It occurs naturally in the otherwise edible common ink cap mushroom (Coprinopsis atramentaria), hence its colloquial name "tippler's bane". Similar reactions have been recorded with Clitocybe clavipes and Suillellus luridus, although the agent in those species is unknown.

History
The synthesis of disulfiram, originally known as tetraethylthiuram disulfide, was first reported in 1881. By around 1900, it was introduced to the industrial process of sulfur vulcanization of rubber and became widely used.  In 1937 a rubber factory doctor in the US published a paper noting that workers exposed to disulfiram had negative reactions to alcohol and could be used as a drug for alcoholism; the effects were also noticed in workers at a Swedish rubber boot factory.

In the early 1940s it had been tested as a treatment for scabies, a parasitic skin infection, as well as intestinal worms.

Around that time, during the German occupation of Denmark, Erik Jacobsen and Jens Hald at the Danish drug company Medicinalco picked up on that research and began exploring the use of disulfiram to treat intestinal parasites.  The company had a group of enthusiastic self-experimenters that called itself the "Death Battalion", and in the course of testing the drug on themselves, accidentally discovered that drinking alcohol while the drug was still in their bodies  made them mildly sick.

They made that discovery in 1945, and did nothing with it until two years later, when Jacobsen gave an impromptu talk and mentioned that work, which was discussed afterwards in newspapers at the time, leading them to further explore the use of the drug for that purpose. That work included small clinical trials with Oluf Martensen-Larsen, a doctor who worked with alcoholics.  They published their work starting in 1948.

The chemists at Medicinalco discovered a new form of disulfiram while trying to purify a batch that had been contaminated with copper. This form turned out to have better pharmacological properties, and the company patented it and used that form for the product that was introduced as Antabus (later anglicized to Antabuse).

This work led to renewed study of the human metabolism of ethanol.  It was already known that ethanol was mostly metabolized in the liver, with it being converted first to acetaldehyde and then acetaldehyde to acetic acid and carbon dioxide, but the enzymes involved were not known.  By 1950 the work led to the knowledge that ethanol is oxidized to acetaldehyde by alcohol dehydrogenase and acetaldehyde is oxidized to acetic acid by aldehyde dehydrogenase (ALDH), and that disulfiram works by inhibiting ALDH, leading to a buildup of acetaldehyde, which is what causes the negative effects in the body.

The drug was first marketed in Denmark and as of 2008, Denmark is the country where it is most widely prescribed. It was approved by the FDA in 1951.  The FDA later approved other drugs for treatment of alcoholism, namely naltrexone in 1994 and acamprosate in 2004.

Society and culture 
Though the Occupational Safety and Health Administration (OSHA) in the US has not set a permissible exposure limit (PEL) for disulfiram in the workplace, the National Institute for Occupational Safety and Health has set a recommended exposure limit (REL) of 2 mg/m3 and recommended that workers avoid concurrent exposure to ethylene dibromide.

Research 
Disulfiram has been studied as a possible treatment for cancer, parasitic infections, anxiety disorder, and latent HIV infection.

Disulfiram has shown reversing of retinitis pigmentosa in rats.

Cancer 
When disulfiram creates complexes with metals (dithiocarbamate complexes), it is a proteasome inhibitor and as of 2016 it had been studied in in vitro experiments, model animals, and small clinical  trials as a possible treatment for liver metastasis, metastatic melanoma, glioblastoma, non-small cell lung cancer, and prostate cancer. Various clinical trials of copper depletion agents have been carried out.

Parasitic infections 
In the body, disulfiram is rapidly metabolized to diethyldithiocarbamate (ditiocarb), which binds to metal ions such as zinc or copper to form zinc or copper diethyldithiocarbamate (zinc or copper ditiocarb). The zinc diethyldithiocarbamate (zinc-ditiocarb) metabolite of disulfiram is extremely potent against the diarrhea and liver abscess-causing parasite Entamoeba histolytica and might be active against other deadly parasites.

HIV 
Disulfiram has also been identified by systematic high-throughput screening as a potential HIV latency reversing agent (LRA). Reactivation of latent HIV infection in patients is part of an investigational strategy known as "shock and kill" which may be able to reduce or eliminate the HIV reservoir. Recent phase II dose-escalation studies in patients with HIV who are controlled on antiretroviral therapy have observed an increase in cell-associated unspliced HIV RNA with increasing exposure to disulfiram and its metabolites. Disulfiram is also being investigated in combination with vorinostat, another investigational latency reversing agent, to treat HIV.

COVID-19 
Disulfiram has been shown to inhibit the papain-like proteases of MERS-CoV and SARS-CoV. It has been examined in a small inconclusive retrospective observational study for its effects on COVID-19 symptoms and is currently in Phase 2 clinical trials.

References

External links 
 
 
 CDC - NIOSH Pocket Guide to Chemical Hazards

Acetaldehyde dehydrogenase inhibitors
Alcohol abuse
Alcohol and health
Antiprotozoal agents
Danish inventions
Dopamine beta hydroxylase inhibitors
Thiuram disulfides

COVID-19 drug development
Substance-related disorders